Kuzminka is a rural locality (a village) in Semizerye Rural Settlement, Kaduysky District, Vologda Oblast, Russia. The population was 24 as of 2002.

Geography 
Kuzminka is located 42 km northwest of Kaduy (the district's administrative centre) by road. Dilskiye is the nearest rural locality.

References 

Rural localities in Kaduysky District